The V-Disc Recordings is a compilation album by Jo Stafford released in 1998.

The V-Disc program began in June 1941 and continued until May 1949.  It was a way for United States service people stationed overseas to have access to the music that was currently popular "at home". Musicians and recording artists made these special recordings strictly for those serving overseas and they were made and distributed by the Armed Forces Radio.  Jo Stafford produced 20 V-Discs for the entertainment of those in the military during this time; this album is a compilation of the V-Disc recordings she made.

Track listing

References

Jo Stafford albums
1998 compilation albums
Jo Stafford compilation albums
American Forces Network
Collectors' Choice Music compilation albums